Studies in Conflict & Terrorism is a monthly peer-reviewed academic journal covering research on terrorism and insurgency. It was established in 1977 as Terrorism, obtaining its current name in 1992 when Terrorism was merged with another journal titled Conflict. It is published by Taylor & Francis and the editor-in-chief is Bruce Hoffman (Georgetown University). The Editorial Board also includes Georgetown University Professor and author Ed Husain. According to the Journal Citation Reports, the journal has a 2016 impact factor of 1.071.

References

External links

Publications established in 1977
Taylor & Francis academic journals
Monthly journals
Political science journals
English-language journals
Terrorism studies